Sirohi House is the former residence of the Maharao of Sirohi in Delhi. The house is located close to Civil Lines, Delhi.

The house is run today as a traveller inn and hotel.

References

External links 
 Images of Sirohi House

Royal residences in Delhi
Sirohi district